National Hurling League champions mean those that won the highest league in hurling in Ireland.

National Hurling League-winning teams

teams
National